Plectromerus navassae is a species of beetle in the family Cerambycidae. It was described by Nearns and Steiner in 2006.

References

Cerambycinae
Beetles described in 2006